X-Level Studios,  formerly known as EMI Studios, Abbey Road Studios and Cosmos Studios, is a recording studio in Skärmarbrink on the outskirts of Stockholm, Sweden. It has been running since the early 1960s.

It was founded by Kent Isaacs, who has been active both in the Swedish music scene as well as internationally since the 1980s, and owned by him until 2012, when it was bought by X-Level Media Group. After the purchase, the name was changed to X-Level Studios.

As Cosmos Studios, it was closely affiliated with sister company Cosmos Music Group.

References

External links

Recording studios in Sweden
Music in Stockholm